USS Siboney (ID-2999) was a ship transport for the United States Navy during World War I. She was the sister ship of  but neither was part of a ship class. Launched as SS Oriente, she was soon renamed after Siboney, Cuba, a landing site of United States forces during the Spanish–American War. After her navy service ended, she was SS Siboney for the New York & Cuba Mail Steamship Co. (commonly called the Ward Line). The ship was operated under charter by American Export Lines beginning in late 1940. During World War II she served the U.S. Army as transport USAT Siboney and as hospital ship USAHS Charles A. Stafford.

As a transport during World War I, Siboney made 17 transatlantic voyages for the navy carrying troops to and from Europe, and had the shortest average in-port turnaround time of all navy transports. During her maiden voyage, her steering gear malfunctioned which resulted in a collision between two other troopships in the convoy.

After her World War I service ended, Siboney was returned to the Ward Line and placed in New York–Cuba–Spain transatlantic service; the liner ran aground at Vigo, Spain in September 1920. Despite considerable damage, she was repaired and placed back in service. In late 1921, Siboney was switched to New York–Cuba–Mexico routes, which were a popular and inexpensive way for Americans to escape Prohibition. In late 1940, she was chartered to American Export Lines to return Americans fleeing Europe at the outset of World War II, making seven roundtrips from Jersey City, New Jersey, to Lisbon.

During World War II, Siboney was requisitioned by the War Shipping Administration (WSA) and assigned to the War Department as a U.S. Army transport. She made several transatlantic trips and called at ports in Africa, the Middle East, Canada, the Caribbean, and the United Kingdom. During a 1944 overhaul, the ship was selected for conversion to a hospital ship. Renamed USAHS Charles A. Stafford after a U.S. Army doctor killed in action in Australia, the ship served in both the European and the Pacific Theatres. After the end of her army service, the ship was laid up in the National Defense Reserve Fleet in February 1948, and sold for scrapping in 1957.

World War I naval service
SS Oriente was a combination cargo and passenger vessel built by William Cramp & Sons, Philadelphia, for the Ward Line. In mid-1917 the United States Shipping Board (USSB) commandeered and received title to all private shipbuilding projects in progress, including the still-incomplete Oriente and her sister ship Orizaba. Plans for both ships were modified for troop carrying duties. Oriente was launched on 15 August 1917, renamed Siboney on 28 February 1918, delivered to the navy on 8 April, and commissioned the same day.

Siboney sailed from Philadelphia on 16 April as a unit of the Cruiser and Transport Force, and arrived at Newport News two days later to embark her first contingent of troops. She departed Hampton Roads on 23 April and joined her first convoy the following day. On 25 April, her rudder jammed; and, in the ensuing confusion, transports  and  collided and had to return to New York. On 4 May, the convoy was joined by the war zone escort of eight destroyers and, on 6 May, Siboney arrived at Brest. Debarking her troops, she sailed the following day and arrived at Hoboken, New Jersey, on 15 May.

Siboney embarked her second contingent of troops at Lambert's Point, Virginia, on 25 May and sailed the following day. The New York section of the convoy joined two days later and the ships entered the war zone on 6 June. Siboney arrived in Bordeaux on 8 June and departed the following day but remained anchored in the mouth of the Gironde until 13 June, awaiting the tanker Woonsocket. On 15 June, the convoy passed six empty lifeboats from the torpedoed transport . Siboney entered the American war zone on 20 June, and the next day rescued survivors of the British vessel, which had been torpedoed three days previously. The transport arrived at New York on 22 June and anchored in the North River.

Siboney sailed for France on 30 June; after delivering her troops at Brest on 12 July, she returned to New York on 25 July. She sailed again on 31 July. Before arriving at Brest on 12 August, she had to maneuver several times to evade possible submarine contacts. She arrived at New York on 22 August and was given a two-week repair period.

On 4 September, Siboney sailed from New York on her fifth crossing and arrived at Saint-Nazaire nine days later. On 15 September, she embarked a number of wounded troops and left Saint-Nazaire the same day, but, due to heavy submarine activity, swung at anchor for several days before her convoy sailed. She arrived on 29 September at New York. On her sixth eastward crossing, between 6 and 15 October, an influenza epidemic broke out among the troops, killing a number of soldiers. Sailing from Brest on 16 October, the transport returned to New York on 24 October.

Siboney had already embarked troops for her next voyage when, on 3 November, she was ordered to disembark them. She sailed the following day with an army brigadier general and his staff, and a naval draft of 500 men. She arrived at Saint-Nazaire on the 12 November, shortly after the announcement of the Armistice, and was met by a cheering crowd.

Siboney then began her peacetime mission of returning American veterans from Europe to the United States. After embarking 513 wounded men at Saint-Nazaire, she moved to Brest on the 15th and took on 600 more passengers. She sailed the same day under escort and reached New York on 24 November. During the next ten months, Siboney made ten more round trips between the United States and France, returning over 3,000 troops per trip when fully loaded. On one such return trip in August 1919, Siboney carried Admiral Henry T. Mayo and Congressman Thomas S. Butler home from France.

According to the Statistical Department of the U.S. Navy, Siboney had the shortest average in-port turnaround time out of 37 U.S. Navy transports used during World War I. The ship completed 17 round trips and had an average turn-around time of just under 30 days per trip, almost ten days shorter than the average of 39.8 days.

On 10 September at Hoboken, Siboney was decommissioned and turned over to the War Department, who returned the ship to the Ward Line, her original owners.

Interwar civilian service
After her reacquisition, the Ward Line placed SS Siboney in transatlantic service on a New York to Havana, Tenerife, Bilbao, Santander, and Vigo route. On 9 September 1920, the ship ran aground in the harbor at Vigo. Initial efforts to re-float her were unsuccessful, but by late October, Siboney had been repaired enough to make it to Shields. Despite considerable damage, Siboney was refitted and placed in service again and, by March 1921, the Ward Line was advertising passage to Spain via Havana aboard her. The Ward Line, however, abandoned the New York–Cuba–Spain service later in 1921 due to a lack of passengers.

By November 1921, Siboney was placed in New York–Cuba–Mexico service, where business thrived, in part because of Prohibition in the United States. Ward Line cruises to Havana were one of the quickest and least expensive ways to what one author called "alcohol-enriched vacations". A typical route from this time period would sail from New York and call at Nassau, Havana, Progreso, Veracruz, and Tampico, skipping Nassau on the return. Prohibition also had a more direct effect on Siboney and her crew. On 27 June 1922, Siboney—freshly returned from Havana with a load of pineapples—was raided by United States Customs Service inspectors who seized 300 bottles of smuggled liquor on board. In December 1923, four boiler room workers were arrested when police became suspicious of a man who had apparently just delivered a supply of alcohol to the docked ship.

Siboney underwent a major refit in 1924 during which time she was replaced on her routes by SS Yucatán, formerly the North German Lloyd ship Prinz Waldemar. After returning to service for the Ward Line, Siboney was the first to relay messages from Miami about the severity of the Great Miami Hurricane when she passed there shortly after the storm hit in September 1926.

On 18 February 1928, Siboney rammed and sank the coal barge Seneca off Ambrose Light during a snowstorm; the barge had been cut down in 1915 from SS Seneca, coincidentally, a former Ward Line ship. Bad luck continued for Siboney on 5 January 1929, when she rammed and sank the Bauer Towing Company tug Phillip Hoffman off the Battery, killing the tug's engineer.

Siboney continued her same routes into the 1930s, and by 1933 typical runs for Siboney were from New York to Havana, Progreso, and Veracruz and back, omitting Progreso on the return. On one such return trip from Veracruz and Havana in April 1935, a passenger had $5,000 worth of diamond and platinum jewelry stolen while on board. By 1939, Siboney, still on the New York–Cuba–Mexico route, sported a new paint scheme of "dove grey" hull and black funnels with white markings to reflect this change in name. In late 1940, however, the struggling Cuba Mail Line chartered Siboney to American Export Lines which employed her on Jersey City–Lisbon service. During her American Export service, one of her passengers to the U.S. was French aviator and writer Antoine de Saint Exupéry, when he immigrated in January 1941 to Asharoken, New York after Germany’s armistice with France.

After answering questions from "K-25" shouted via loudspeaker, Siboney was allowed to resume her course. Habel filed a protest with British officials when Siboney docked at Bermuda.

World War II Army service

At the conclusion of her seventh and final journey for American Export, Siboney was placed under time charter for duty as an Army transport. After a hasty outfitting, the redesignated USAT Siboney was put to work transporting troops. Based in New York, she made trips up and down the Atlantic and into the Caribbean, and, by the end of 1941, had called at Bermuda, San Juan, Trinidad, St. John's, Charleston, Newport News, Cristóbal, Jamaica, and Panama.

December 1941 saw Siboney depart from New York to Trinidad and on to Cape Town, then sailing up the east coast of Africa to Basra, Iraq, and Bandar Shahpur, Iran. The ship returned to Cape Town via Aden and underwent routine boiler repairs there, before returning to New York in April 1942. After undergoing six weeks of repairs at Bethlehem Steel Company, the transport sailed for Halifax, Iceland, and the Clyde, Scotland, in late May, returning to New York in July. Another trip to England and back followed in September 1942.

On 1 July 1942 the ship had been acquired by the War Shipping Administration (WSA) under a bareboat charter converting the Army's time charter to a sub bareboat charter. On 9 August 1943 WSA purchased the ship with the Army's bareboat charter continued.

In early December 1942 Siboney departed for Newfoundland but put into Halifax for two months of drydocking and repairs after she collided with SS City of Kimberly. After returning to New York in February 1943, she made several transatlantic runs, calling at Casablanca, Oran, Gibraltar, Clyde, Durban, Rio de Janeiro, Trinidad, and Cuba over the next 11 months. Siboney returned to New York for major repairs and reboilering at Bethlehem Steel Co. In January 1944, while undergoing this work, the ship was selected for conversion to a hospital ship.

The ship was renamed USAHS Charles A. Stafford after Captain Charles A. Stafford of the U.S. Army Medical Corps, who was killed during the air raid on Broome, Western Australia, while participating in the evacuation of Java on 3 March 1942. With her conversion complete in September 1944, the Stafford, equipped with new boilers, a single stack in place of her original two, and other improvements, moved to her new homeport of Charleston. From that port the ship made monthly runs to the United Kingdom and back until May 1945, interrupting the pattern only once for a trip to Gibraltar and Marseilles. Steaming to New York at the conclusion of her last transatlantic run, Charles A. Stafford was overhauled for duty in the South Pacific.

With the alterations complete, the veteran ship—now homeported at Los Angeles—sailed in August 1945 for Cristobál and on to Honolulu, Manila, Biak, Leyte, and Mindoro. After returning to Los Angeles in October, the Stafford sailed for Honolulu, Manila, and Eniwetok and back.

After sailing to her new homeport of New York via the Panama Canal during February 1946, Charles A. Stafford resumed her North Atlantic runs to the UK.

On 30 August 1946 the Army transferred the ship to the Maritime Commission. On 16 February 1948 the ship was placed in the James River Reserve Fleet. Kept on reserve under her original name of Siboney, the ship was sold by the Maritime Administration on 2 January 1957 for $286,125 to Bethlehem Steel for scrapping.

Footnotes

Notes

References

External links

 USS Siboney (ID-2999) photo archive from the U.S. Navy Historical Center
 
 Photos of SS Siboney from Wardline.com: 
 Interior of Stateroom No. 1, c. 1925
 Docked at Havana, 1 March 1930
 Preparing to dock at Vera Cruz, c. 1934
 Dockside at Vera Cruz, c. 1937
 In "Cuba Mail Line" livery at New York, c. 1939

Ships built by William Cramp & Sons
World War I auxiliary ships of the United States
Transport ships of the United States Army
Hospital ships of the United States Army
Ships of the Ward Line
1917 ships
Ships of American Export-Isbrandtsen Lines
Maritime incidents in 1920
Maritime incidents in 1928
Maritime incidents in 1929
Maritime incidents in April 1941